Hakea pritzelii is a flowering shrub in the family Proteaceae and is endemic  to a few small areas  in the Great Southern region of Western Australia. It has rigid, pale green leaves and scented red-purple flowers.

Description
It blooms from July to August and produces sweetly scented red-purple flowers with a light green style in clusters in leaf axils or along stems on old wood. The leaves are obovate, thick, rigid and stem clasping with a prominent sharp point. The  pale green leaves vary from being entire to shallowly divided having 3, 5 or 9 small very sharp, prickly teeth.

Taxonomy and naming
Hakea pritzelii was first formally described in 1904 Ludwig Diels and the description was published in Botanische Jahrbücher für Systematik, Pflanzengeschichte und Pflanzengeographie. The species was named after the German botanist Ernst Georg Pritzel who travelled with Ludwig Diels collecting specimens of Western Australia flora.

Distribution and habitat
Hakea pritzelii grows from Cranbrook and the Stirling Range National Park to Gnowangerup in heath and scrubland in white sand. Often found in low lying seasonally wet areas.  A good habitat plant due to its dense prickly habit.

Conservation status
Although Hakea pritzelii has a restricted range, it is considered "not threatened" by the Western Australian Government Department of Parks and Wildlife.

References

pritzelii
Eudicots of Western Australia
Plants described in 1904